Naji Sayed (born 1967) is an Emirati former cyclist. He competed in the team time trial at the 1988 Summer Olympics.

References

External links
 

1967 births
Living people
Emirati male cyclists
Olympic cyclists of the United Arab Emirates
Cyclists at the 1988 Summer Olympics
Place of birth missing (living people)